Laser European Championships are annual European Championship sailing regattas in the Laser and Laser Radial classes organised by the EurILCA.

Editions

Medalists

Laser

Men's Laser Radial

Women's Laser Radial

References

European championships in sailing
Laser (dinghy) competitions
Laser Radial competitions
Recurring sporting events established in 1974